Debbane Palace, also Qasr Debbane, Dar Ali Agha al-Hammud, and Dar Debbané, is an Arab-Ottoman-style grand mansion in Sidon, Lebanon. The palace was built as a private residence in 1721 by Ali Agha al-Hammud, a Sidonian notable descending from a long line of builders. The palace was built around a central courtyard without any street-level openings to ensure the privacy of its occupants. Only the reception area or selamlik remains of the palace's original wings; it features an indoor fountain, elaborate multicolored mosaics, muqarnas ornaments and sculpted Lebanese cedar ceilings. The palace changed hands and functions after the loss of the Hammuds' political influence and wealth. The western part of the mansion, including the selamlik was bought in 1859 by Asin Khlat Debbane, the wife of  a rich sericulturist and silk trader. The Dar was thenceforth known as Qasr Debbane or Debbane Palace; it became the private residence of the Debbane family until the early years of the Lebanese Civil War in 1976. During the war the palace was damaged and ransacked. After the end of the war the palace was restored and turned into a private museum.

History

Historical background 
During the 15th-century reign of Sultan Mehmed II, the Ottomans introduced the Iltizam tax-farming system in which a mültezim was responsible for collecting revenue from a mukataa, a parcel of land owned by the Ottoman crown. The term of an Iltizam ranged from one to twelve years. In 1695, the Iltizam was superseded by the Malikâne system where tax-farming contracts were granted for life, and a tenant could give the tax-farm to an heir if the treasury agreed. Under both systems, revenue collection rights were awarded to the highest bidder who could keep profits after forwarding to the Sublime Porte (imperial government).
 
The ayan, a class of local notables or dynasts, developed into the chief owners of these rights. They were more efficient than the governors in the preceding Timar system at forwarding revenues to Porte, and their local nature afforded them more knowledge of the region's politics and a vested interest in its success.

The Hammud ayan established themselves in the port city of Sidon in the 16th or 17th century and became its tax collectors from the early 18th century. They benefited from the 1695 fiscal reform, which granted them lifetime Malikâne, thereby increasing their political power and wealth significantly. Before the "age of Ayan", urban development had been the privilege of non-local Ottoman officials; the Hammuds were prime among other Sidonian notables to sponsor large-scale urban development projects, including the construction of commanding private residences, mosques, public hammams (bathhouses), khans (caravanserais) and schools, among other buildings. Mustafa Katkhuda, a Hammud notable of the first half of the 17th century, was the first to leave material architectural evidence of the family's involvement in urban development. Katkhuda commissioned Sidon's Kikhiya mosque in 1634–1645. In the early 18th century, Mustafa Agha al-Hammud was the first Hammud to be identified in written records. He was a prolific builder; among his commissions are the city's Hammam al-Jadid (New Bathhouse) and the enlargement of the Bahri Mosque.
 
The family's building activity was continued by Mustafa's son Ali Agha al-Hammud, who had become Sidon's tax farmer around the late 1710s and held that position until ; Ali was, like Mustafa a waqf (religious endowment) trustee. He commissioned two of the city's most prestigious private residences to showcase his wealth; he also commissioned public amenities including Khan al-Hummus and Hammam al-Ward (Rose Bathhouse).

History of the palace 

Dar Ali Agha al-Hammud was built in 1721 by Ali Agha al-Hammud in the eastern part of Sidon's medina. A wall inscription above the door to the qa'a (guestroom) dating to 1730–1731 (1143 AH) asserts that Ali al-Hammud was the patron of the house. In the late 1730s, Ahmad al-Hammud inherited the public functions of his father Ali. Ahmad ran into many lawsuits and financial problems in addition to his uneasy relations with the Ottoman governor of Sidon. He was accused of selling waqf properties to the French. In 1739, he was appointed mutassallim (deputy governor) of Sidon but eventually lost his political influence and source of wealth with the rise to power of the local Acre-based chief and tax farmer Zahir al-Umar. With Ahmad's demise, the Hammuds' urban development activity ceased. After the Hammuds' loss of influence the family mansion was transformed into the seat of an Ottoman governmental office. In 1871 city archives the mansion is described as a saray (government headquarters) and in 1901 as the Dar al-Hukuma al-Qadima (Old Government Headquarters), indicating that it was used at the time as a local Ottoman administrative building.In 1856, the Sacy family acquired the haremlik (harem quarters) at the eastern end of the mansion as their private palace. The western part of the mansion, including the selamlik (Ottoman reception hall), was bought in 1859 by Asin Khlat, the wife of Youssef Debbane, a rich sericulturist and silk trader. The Dar was thenceforth known as Qasr Debbane or Debbane Palace; it became the private residence of the Debbane family since 1859 until the early years of the Lebanese Civil War in 1976. During the war, Sidon was shelled, and then-owner Mary Audi-Debbane moved to Beirut, leaving the palace unattended. The palace was squatted by hundreds of Palestinian refugees, who fled the conflict in the city of Tyre in February 1978; the palace was further damaged and ransacked by militiamen who squatted there in 1983.
 
The qasr was listed as a historical monument by the Lebanon's Ministry of Culture in 1968. In 1999 Georges, François, Jean Debbane, and Marie Debbane-Naggear renounced their rights of ownership as heirs to the Debbané Foundation. The Debbané Foundation is a Melkite religious waqf, managed by a committee representing the Debbane family, the director general of Antiquities of Lebanon, the mayor of the city, and the Greek-Catholic bishop of Saida. The palace was restored by the Debbané Foundation in 2000 at an approximate cost of $2.5 million.  The palace was opened as a private museum during the UNESCO 2001 seminar in Saïda.

Architecture 
The palace was built in the Arab-Ottoman style with characteristic architectural features of a house with a central courtyard. This architectural archetype ensured the inhabitants' privacy by removing street-facing openings. The ground floor is occupied by shops, a deprecated stable and a garden. The courtyard is elevated from the street level; it is accessible by a narrow staircase and an entrance porch that opens to the souk. The courtyard has a water fountain at its center and gives access to all of the 18th-century palace wings, including the selamlik and the now obliterated private haremlik. The surviving selamlik includes reception halls and the Damascene-style decorated grand qa'a. The qa'a comprises a raised sitting area (tazar) where the owner's guests of honor would be seated on diwans. The tazar is preceded by a 'ataba, a reception area one step lower than the tazar, where regular guests were received.  The qa'a is decorated with multicolored mosaics, muqarnas ornaments and sculpted Lebanese cedar ceilings. The central courtyard leads also to an iwan flanked by two reception rooms and various service areas.

Alterations 
Of the Palace's original 18th-century plan, only the selamlik, iwan, and service areas remain, the haremlik being destroyed during the 19th century. To accommodate their growing family, the Debbanes added two levels to the palace in the Levantine neo-Classical style during renovations undertaken between 1917 and 1920. The open courtyard was vertically extended by the addition of a gallery covered by a four-sided red tile roof. The new gallery was designed in the Damascene style with ablaq (alternating) motifs running on all its sides. A tiyyara, a tower-like structure, was later added on the terrace of the second floor.

Collections and exhibition spaces 

The Debbane Palace ground floor's stately chambers and furnishings provide a glimpse of a traditional Ottoman house. In addition to Ottoman era furniture and décor, the selamlik chambers hold a collection of  Ottoman-era wood and ivory-inlaid musical instruments from Syria including ouds and buzuqs. The museum also boasts six exhibition spaces; these occupy the bedrooms built in the early 20th century. One of the rooms will host the planned virtual museum of the necropolis of the kings of Sidon; this exhibition will include high resolution photographs of the collection of royal Sidonian sarcophagi. The 16 sarcophagi were discovered in 1887 in an orchard north-east of the city near the village of Helalieh; they were moved by the Ottomans after their unearthing to the Istanbul Archaeology Museum. The exhibition space includes the library of jurist and law professor François Debbane; it holds more than 2,500 works including 50 rare books. A third room exhibits the history of the Debbane family and the genealogical family tree. The tayyara houses a collection of old films and photographs of the city of Saida.

Notes

References

Bibliography
 
 

 
 
 

Palaces in Lebanon
Museums in Lebanon